Black, Brown and Beige is an extended jazz work written by Duke Ellington for his first concert at Carnegie Hall, on January 23, 1943. It tells the history of African Americans and was the composer's daring attempt to transform attitudes about race, elevate American music (Jazz) on par with classical European music and challenge America to live up to her founding principles of freedom and equality for all.

Form and characteristics
Black, the first movement, is divided into three parts: the Work Song; the spiritual Come Sunday; and Light. Brown also has three parts: West Indian Influence (or West Indian Dance); Emancipation Celebration (reworked as Lighter Attitude); and The Blues. Beige depicts "the Afro-American of the 1920s, 30s and World War II" according to Leonard Feather's notes for the 1977 release of the original 1943 performance.

History
Ellington introduced the piece at Carnegie Hall on January 23, 1943 as "a parallel to the history of the Negro in America." In writing Black, Brown and Beige, Ellington endeavored to create a Jazz composition as sweeping as any classical work, with the following bold statement, "...unhampered by any musical form, in which I intend to protray the experiences of the colored races in America in the syncopated idiom...I am putting all I have learned into it in the hope that I shall have achieved something really worthwhile in the literature of music, and that an authentic record of my race written by a member of it shall be placed on record."   At the December 11, 1943 concert at Carnegie Hall, Ellington said, "We thought we wouldn't play it (Black, Brown and Beige) in its entirety tonight because it represents an awfully long and important story and that I don't think too many people are familiar with the story. This is the one we dedicate to the 700 Negroes who came from Haiti to save Savannah during the Revolutionary War", a reference to the Chasseurs-Volontaires de Saint-Domingue who fought at the siege of Savannah.

Music critics, mistakenly judging it by classical music standards, gave the 1943 concert mixed reviews.  Ellington responded to critics, saying "Well, I guess they just didn't dig it."  He never performed the entire work again, breaking it into shorter excerpts.  Ellington reworked a partial version ("Black" only) of the suite for his 1958 album Black, Brown, and Beige, after which "Come Sunday" (featuring Gospel artist Mahalia Jackson on the album's vocal version of that piece) became a jazz standard.  The album notes for Wynton Marsalis's 2018 performance states that Black, Brown and Beige has "received its overdue praise with the passage of time."

Recordings
 The Duke Ellington Carnegie Hall Concerts: January 1943 (Prestige Records, a double CD on Prestige #2PCD-304004-2) - a recording of the January 23, 1943 Carnegie Hall premiere
 Black, Brown and Beige (RCA Records, 1988 compilation) - includes 1943 excerpts, the first re-released instances of Black, Brown and Beige segments available on modern commercial recordings
 Black, Brown and Beige (Columbia Records, 1958 release) - a partial ("Black" only) reworked suite, with Mahalia Jackson on vocal
 The Private Collection, Vol. 10: Studio Sessions New York & Chicago, 1965, 1966 & 1971 (LMR Records, 1987 release) - a privately recorded revision of the three-movement piece into a nine-part work, and the most complete studio version of the suite. Eight of the nine parts were recorded in 1965; the other, "The Blues," was recorded in 1971 with vocalist Tony Watkins
 Black, Brown and Beige (Blue Engine Records, 2020 release) - a live performance of the complete original suite recorded by the Jazz at Lincoln Center Orchestra in 2018

References

Further reading
 Burrows, George  "Black, Brown and Beige and the politics of Signifyin(g): Towards a critical understanding of Duke Ellington." Jazz research journal, 1 (May 2007): 45-71 
 Gaines, Kevin. "Duke Ellington, Black, Brown, and Beige, and the cultural politics of race" in Radano, Ronald Michael  ed., Music and the racial imagination (Chicago, IL, USA : University of Chicago Press, 2000), 585–602.
 Tucker, Mark, ed.  The Duke Ellington Reader (New York: Oxford Univ. Press, 1993), 153-204 reprints original 1943 journalistic coverage as well as later analytical articles.  
 Helen M. Oakley. "Ellington to Offer 'Tone Parallel'" repr. from Down Beat (15 January 1943), 13. Preview of the concert.
 Howard Taubman. "The 'Duke' Invades Carnegie Hall." repr. from New York Times Magazine (17 January 1943), 10, 30.  Preview of the concert.
 Program for the first Carnegie Hall Concert repr. from the Duke Ellington Collection, Smithsonian.
 Paul Bowles. "Duke Ellington in Recital for Russian War Relief" repr. from New York Herald-Tribune (25 January 1943).  Review of the concert.
 Mike Levin. "Duke Fuses Classical and Jazz!" repr. from Down Beat (15 February 1943), 12–13. Review of the concert.
 John Hammond. "Is the Duke Deserting Jazz?" repr. from Jazz 1/8 (May 1943), 15, accompanied by Leonard Feather's rebuttal in the same issue, pp. 14 & 20.  Bob Thiele continued this discussion with "The Case of Jazz Music" in Jazz 1/9 (July 1943), 19–20.
 [Kurt List], review of abridged 1944 Victor recording in Listen 7/6 (April 1946), 13
 Robert D. Crowley. "Black, Brown and Beige after 16 Years" Jazz 2 (1959), 98-104.
 Brian Priestley and Alan Cohen. "Black, Brown & Beige." Composer 51 (Spring 1974), 33–37; 52 (Summer 1974), 29–32; 53 (Winter 1974-75), 29–32.
 Tucker, Mark, ed. Duke Ellington's Black, Brown and Beige, a complete commemorative 50th-anniversary issue of Black music research journal 13/2 (Fall, 1993) , with articles by:
 Mark Tucker, "The genesis of Black, Brown and Beige"
 Andrew Homzy, "Black, Brown and  Beige in Duke Ellington's repertoire, 1943-1973"
 Kurt Dietrich, "The role of trombones in Black, Brown and Beige"
 Scott DeVeaux, "Black, Brown and  Beige and the critics"
 Sief Hoefsmit & Andrew Homzy, "Chronology of Ellington's recordings and  performances of Black, Brown and Beige"
 Maurice Peress, "My life with Black, Brown and Beige"
 Knauer, Wolfram. "Simulated improvisation in Duke Ellington's Black, Brown and Beige." The black perspective in music, 18 (1990): 20–38.
 Claude Bolling, Bolling's Orchestra plays Ellington: Black, Brown, and Beige, Frémeaux et associés, FA489, 1990. This is the entire recreation of the suite.
 Massagli, Luciano and Volonte, Giovanni. The New Desor: an updated edition of Duke Ellington's Story on Records, 1924-1974, Parts One and Two. 1999, Milan, Italy.

External links
"Black, Brown, and Beige" about the recreation by Claude Bolling
"Black, Brown, and Beige" Essay by Will Friedwald
"Black, Brown, & Beige" Richard Wang
"Black, Brown, & Beige:Duke Ellington's Historic Jazz Symphony" Indiana Public Media

Compositions by Duke Ellington
Grammy Hall of Fame Award recipients
1943 songs